Kong the Untamed is a comic book series published by DC Comics that ran for five issues. It was created in 1975 by writer Jack Oleck and artist Alfredo Alcala. The title character, Kong, is an intelligent caveman who is a direct descendant of Anthro, another DC Comics caveman character.

References

External links

1975 comics debuts
1976 comics endings
Comics characters introduced in 1975
DC Comics fantasy characters
DC Comics titles
Fictional fishers
Fictional hunters
Fictional prehistoric characters
Comics set in prehistory